Begonia parvifolia, called the small-leaved begonia, is a species of flowering plant in the genus Begonia, native to southeast Brazil.

References

parvifolia
Endemic flora of Brazil
Plants described in 1827